Giovanna Boram Yun Echevarría (Korean: 윤보람; born 18 July 1992) is a Uruguayan footballer who plays as a midfielder for Campeonato Uruguayo Femenino club Defensor Sporting and the Uruguay women's national team.

Club career
Yun played in Uruguay for River Plate, Nacional and Peñarol.

International career
Yun capped for Uruguay at the 2014 Copa América Femenina.

Personal life
Yun is of partial South Korean descent.

References

External links

1992 births
Living people
Uruguayan women's footballers
Women's association football midfielders
Uruguay women's international footballers
Uruguayan people of South Korean descent
Sportspeople of Korean descent
Uruguayan expatriate women's footballers
Uruguayan expatriate sportspeople in Spain
Expatriate women's footballers in Spain